Hydra (or THC Hydra) is a parallelized network login cracker built in various operating systems like Kali Linux, Parrot and other major penetration testing environments. Hydra works by using different approaches to perform brute-force attacks in order to guess the right username and password combination. Hydra is commonly used by penetration testers together with a set of programmes like crunch, cupp etc, which are used to generate wordlists. Hydra is then used to test the attacks using the wordlists that these programmes created.

Hydra is set to be updated over time as more services become supported. The creator of Hydra publishes his work in repositories like GitHub.

Supported protocols 

Hydra supports many common login protocols like forms on websites, FTP, SMB, POP3, IMAP, MySQL, VNC, SSH, HTTP(S) and others.

References

External links 
 Official website

Password cracking software